Hare Krishna Golden Temple (Telugu: హరే కృష్ణ గోల్డెన్ టెంపుల్) is located at Banjara Hills, Hyderabad, India. It is the first Golden Temple to be constructed in Telangana. It was inaugurated in 2018 by Vice President of India Sri Venkaiah Naidu.

Hare Krishna Hill 
Hare Krishna Hill is the hillock on which this temple is situated. HKM Hyderabad is a charitable society with the objective of propagating Krishna consciousness all over the world.

Features of the temple 
About 700 years ago the Lord manifested himself as Swayambhu Sri Lakshmi Narasimha Swamy at Road No. 12 Banjara Hills. 
Along with Lord Swayambhu Sri Lakshmi Narasimha Swamy, Lord Shiva also self manifested himself as Swayambhu Sri Panchajanyeshwara Swamy at the same place.
The Hare Krishna Golden Temple is the 1st Golden Temple in Telangana and this transcendental temple of the Lord has a 50 foot Golden Dhwaja Stambh, 4600 square foot Maha Mandapam and five golden stairs Rajagopuram.
The uniqueness of Lord's manifestation at this place is that the Lord and his eternal consort Sri Lakshmi Devi are in a self-manifest standing posture where Lord Narasimhadev appears in a blissful divine state and Mother Lakshmi Devi is mercifully showing her Abhaya Hastha and blessing all the devotees.
The Temple has Harinam Japa Mantapa located right after the Dhvaja Stambha. It provides a unique way to remember and glorify Lord Krishna by chanting His holy names while proceeding for His darshan. Visitors to the temple can choose to either go through the Harinam Mantapa or directly proceed for darshan of Lord Shri Lakshmi Narasimha. The Japa Mantapa has 108 steps and on every step the devotees stand and chant the Hare Krishna maha-mantra.
There is a rare Saligrama (Shaligrama or Salagrama) shila kept in the Garbhalayam of the presiding deity Swayambhu Sri Lakshmi Narasimha Swamy. This Saligrama Shila was found in Gandaki River (Near Muktinath Temple, Nepal) and miraculously arrived at this Kshetram by the inconceivable potency of the Lord.

Shrines (altars) 

Hare Krishna Golden Temple has two shrines:

 First shrine is dedicated to Swayambhu Sri Lakshmi Narasimha Swamy
 Second shrine is dedicated to Sri Sri Radha-Govinda.

Darshan Timings 

The temple is open for Public Darshan  from  7.15 am to 12.15 am during the Morning Session and from 5.15 pm to 8.15 pm in the evening session . The day begins with a Grand Aarti ceremony called mangala-arati followed by worship of Tulasi Devi, Sri Narasimha Arati. During every arati session the devotees sing and dance to the rhythm of Hare Krishna (mantra).

Hare Krishna Golden Temple timings:

Morning 
 Mangal Aarti - 04.30 AM 
 Darshan Aarti - 07.15 AM
 Pallaki & Guru Puja- 07.35 - 08.20 AM 
 Srimad Bhagavata Purana Class- 08.30 AM 
 Darshan Close- 12.15 PM

Evening 
First Darshan- 5.15 PM
Tulasi Aarti - 06.45 PM 
Sandhya Aarti - 07.00 PM
Shayan Aarti - 8.00 PM
Darshan Closes- 8.15 PM

Weekends 
Afternoon closing time- 12.15 PM on weekdays and 12.30 PM on weekends
Evening closing time- 08.45 PM

Festivals 
HKM Golden temple celebrates festivals that are related to avatars of Lord Vishnu or with Vedic culture. Main festivals that are celebrated within the temple are:

Rama Navami
Brahmotsava
Narasimha Jayanti
Panihati Chida-dahi
Ratha Yatra
Balaram Jayanti
Jhulan Utsav
Sri Krishna Janmashtami
Vyasa Puja
Sri Radhashtami
Deepotsava
Govardhan Puja
Vaikuntha Ekadashi
Nityananda Trayodashi 
Gaura Poornima
Sri Lakshmi Narasimha Swamy Abhishekam-Every month Swathi Nakshatra Day

Social services 

Hare Krishna Golden Temple also known as HKM Hyderabad provides free food to those in need through various food distribution programmes such as Akshaya Patra, the world's largest NGO-run mid-day meal programme serves Over 1.8 Million meals to school children every day. and other programmes including Bhojanamrita Saddimoota and Annapoorana schemes. The visitors to the temple are provided free lunch from 12.30 PM through Nitya Annadana Seva .

Gallery

References

External links 

World's Largest Hindu Temple
HKM Hyderabad
ISKCON Bangalore
The tallest krishna temple in the world, Vrindavan Chandrodaya Mandir
Akshaya Patra the world's largest Mid-Day Meal Programme
The Akshaya Patra Foundation

Hare Krishnas
Hindu temples in Hyderabad district
2018 establishments in Telangana